Alp-Tegin, ( Alptegīn or Alptigīn) or Alptekin, was a Turkic slave commander of the Samanid Empire, who would later become the semi-independent governor of Ghazna from 962 until his death in 963.

Before becoming governor of Ghazni, Alp-Tegin was the commander-in-chief (sipahsalar) of the Samanid army in Khorasan. In a political fallout over succession of the Samanids he crossed the Hindu Kush mountains southward and captured Ghazna, located strategically between Kabul and Kandahar in present-day Afghanistan, and thereby establishing his own principality, which, however, was still under Samanid authority. He was succeeded by his son, Abu Ishaq Ibrahim.

Biography

Origin
Alp-Tegin was originally part of the nomadic Turks that roamed the Central Asian steppes, but was later captured and brought as a slave to the Samanid capital of Bukhara, where he was raised in the Samanid court. Despite being of Turkic stock and allegedly in speech, Alp-Tegin was highly Persianized.

Service under Nuh I and Abd al-Malik I 
During the reign of Nuh I (r. 943–954), Alp-Tegin was appointed as the head of the royal guard (hajib al-hujjab). During the reign of Nuh's son and successor Abd al-Malik I (r. 954–961), Alp-Tegin was appointed as the governor of Balkh, and by 961 he was the commander-in-chief (sipahsalar) of the Samanid army in Khorasan, thus succeeding Abu Mansur Muhammad. On 10 February 961, Alp-Tegin arrived to Nishapur with his vizier Abu Abdallah Muhammad ibn al-Shibli. Alp-Tegin also played a major role in the appointment of Muhammad Bal'ami as vizier, whom he became close allies with.

Abd al-Malik I died a few months later (November). Alp-Tegin and Bal'ami sought to use his death as an opportunity to make the deceased ruler's young son Nasr the new ruler, in order to rule on his behalf. 

However, several powerful figures of the Samanid state, such as Fa'iq Khassa, favored Abd al-Malik's brother Mansur I, and managed to make him the new ruler. Bal'ami then quickly went over to Fa'iq's side, leaving Alp-Tegin isolated. 
Mansur I upon his accession had Alp-Tegin dismissed from the governorship of Khorasan.

Flight and recognition as governor of Ghazna
Alp-Tegin then took his personal guard of Turkic slave-soldiers and group of Iranian ghazis to Balkh, where he in April 962 defeated an army sent by Mansur I. He then left for Ghazna, a small town in Zabulistan ruled by the local Lawik dynasty, defeating the forces of the local rulers of Bamiyan and Kabul along the way.
He seized Ghazna from Abu Bakr Lawik,  a kinsman of the Kabulshah, and secured his position by receiving an investiture from the Samanids as the governor of Ghazna.

Alp-Tegin died a few months later (September 963) and was succeeded by his son Abu Ishaq Ibrahim. 
Sabuktigin, a slave who was bought by Alp-Tegin and had accompanied him to Ghazna, was appointed as the ruler of Ghazna by the Turks of the town in 977,  marking the start of the Ghaznavid dynasty, which would go on to conquer all of Transoxiana and Khurasan.

References

Sources

 
 
 
 
 
 
 
 

10th-century births
963 deaths
Ghilman
10th-century Turkic people
Samanid generals
Samanid governors of Khorasan
Samanid governors of Ghazna
Medieval slaves
Slaves of the Samanid Empire